Bill Briggs is an American football coach.  He served as the head football coach at West Virginia University Institute of Technology in Montgomery, West Virginia for the 2005 season, compiling a record of 0–11.

References

Year of birth missing (living people)
Living people
Mount Senario Fighting Saints football coaches
Rocky Mountain Battlin' Bears football coaches
Union (Kentucky) Bulldogs football coaches
West Virginia Tech Golden Bears football coaches